Christine Radogno (born December 21, 1952) is an American politician and former Republican member of the Illinois Senate, representing the 41st Legislative District in Cook, DuPage, and Will Counties from 1997 to 2017. Radogno served as the Minority Leader, the first female leader of a political party in the Illinois Legislature.  She resigned from the Illinois State Senate on July 1, 2017 amid the Illinois budget crisis.

Early life, education and career
Radogno was educated in the Chicago area. She graduated from Lyons Township High School. She received both her Bachelor's and Master's degree in Social Work from Loyola University Chicago.

Before entering politics, she worked as a social worker at Mercy Center for Health Care Services. Her interest in politics began when she decided to prevent the opening of a fire station on her street, and Radogno ran successfully for Village of LaGrange Trustee (1989–1996). In 1996, she ran for the Illinois State Senate and narrowly defeated incumbent Robert Raica in the Republican primary. In 2006, she was the Republican nominee for Illinois State Treasurer and was defeated by Democrat Alexi Giannoulias.

On October 12, 2015, she was named as Illinois state chair of John Kasich's presidential campaign.

On July 1, 2017, Rodagno resigned from the state Senate.

Illinois Senate
Her committee memberships includes:
Committee on Rules (Minority Spokesperson)
Human Services (Minority Spokesperson)
Appropriations I
Appropriations II
Appropriations III
Executive
Public Health
Commission on Government Forecasting and Accountability

Personal life
Radogno lives with her husband, Nunzio, in Lemont, Illinois. They have three adult daughters, one of whom, Lisa, was struck by a car on May 8, 2014 in Washington, D. C. and died on June 18.

References

External links
Biography, bills and committees at the 98th Illinois General Assembly
By session: 98th, 97th, 96th, 95th, 94th, 93rd
Christine Radogno legislative website
Christine Radogno, Senate Republican Leader at Illinois Senate Republicans
 

1952 births
Republican Party Illinois state senators
Lemont, Illinois
Living people
Loyola University Chicago alumni
People from Oak Park, Illinois
Women state legislators in Illinois
21st-century American politicians
21st-century American women politicians